Eita is a Japanese male given name. The meaning of the name varies depending on which kanji is used to write the name.

People
Eita (瑛太, born 1982), Japanese actor
Eita Kasagawa (笠川 永太, born 1990), Japanese football player
Eita (wrestler) (小林 瑛太, born 1991), Japanese professional wrestler
Eita Mizuno (水野 英多), Japanese manga artist
Eita Mori (森 栄太, born 1983), Japanese sports shooter

Fictional character 

 Eita Semi (瀬見 英太), a character from the manga and anime Haikyu!! with the position of setter from Shiratorizawa Academy

Japanese masculine given names